Qeshlaq Amir Khanlu may refer to:
Qeshlaq Amir Khanlu-ye Hajji Shakar
Qeshlaq Amir Khanlu-ye Hajji Tapduq
Qeshlaq Amir Khanlu-ye Moharramabad
Qeshlaq Amir Khanlu-ye Pol-e Rahman
Qeshlaq Amir Khanlu-ye Qarah Saqqal